General elections were held in Southern Rhodesia on 25 April 1946, seven years after the previous elections in 1939, the term of the Southern Rhodesian Legislative Assembly having been extended so that there would be no general elections during World War II. The elections showed a strong shift to the right, as the United Party government led by Prime Minister Godfrey Huggins lost its overall majority; however, Huggins could count on the support of one of the factions of the Rhodesia Labour Party in any vote of confidence and therefore remained in office.

Electoral system
During the war a number of changes to the franchise had been made. The arrival of large numbers of British subjects to train as pilots for the Royal Air Force from 1940 led to a sudden increase in the electorate. Many Rhodesians felt that the forces personnel ought not to have the vote, given that their presence in Rhodesia was transitory and they had no long-term commitment. Therefore, the Assembly passed the Electoral Amendment Act 1941 which disfranchised them. The Act also disfranchised British subjects from other dominions who were not prepared to make a declaration of willingness to serve in Southern Rhodesia's defence forces. A third provision of the Act was to extend a previous lifetime disqualification of those sentenced to imprisonment to those given suspended prison sentences.

In the Civil Disabilities Act 1942, anyone convicted of treasonable or seditious practices, those who had deserted from or evaded service in the Army, or who were cashiered or dishonourably discharged, was disqualified from registration as a voter. To cope with the large number of Rhodesians serving away from the colony in the armed forces, the Active Service Voters Act 1943 permitted them to record their votes in a general election. They were permitted to vote for a political party rather than an individual candidate.

There were no alterations to the boundaries of the electoral districts.

Political parties
The twists and turns within the Rhodesia Labour Party which led it to divide into two parties at this election are recounted in the article on the Rhodesia Labour Party.

Jacob Smit, who had been an ally of Huggins in Reform Party days and previously served at the Ministry of Finance, went into opposition early in 1944. He joined a group of conservatives who were developing a new political party on the principles of economy in public spending, free enterprise, and seeking dominion status within the British Empire. Smit was soon appointed the Leader of this group, which named itself the Southern Rhodesia Liberal Party.

Results

By constituency
 Ind – Independent
 Lab – Rhodesia Labour Party
 L – Liberal Party
 SR Lab – Southern Rhodesia Labour Party
 UP – United Party

Changes during the Assembly

Lomagundi
On 15 July 1946 an election petition from George Henry Hackwill in relation to the Lomagundi district was allowed. As a result, Patrick Archibald Wise was unseated, and Hackwill was declared elected.

Umtali North
Tom Ian Findlay Wilson resigned from the Assembly in September 1946. A byelection was held to replace him on 8 November 1946.

Hartley
Thomas James Golding died on 2 August 1947. A byelection was held in his constituency on 26 September 1947.

References
 Source Book of Parliamentary Elections and Referenda in Southern Rhodesia 1898–1962 ed. by F.M.G. Willson (Department of Government, University College of Rhodesia and Nyasaland, Salisbury 1963)
 Holders of Administrative and Ministerial Office 1894–1964 by F.M.G. Willson and G.C. Passmore, assisted by Margaret T. Mitchell (Source Book No. 3, Department of Government, University College of Rhodesia and Nyasaland, Salisbury 1966)

Elections in Southern Rhodesia
Southern Rhodesia
1946 in Southern Rhodesia
Southern Rhodesia